The Natt and Christena McDougall House is a house located in northwest Portland, Oregon, that is listed on the National Register of Historic Places.

It was designed by architect Ellis Lawrence in Arts & Crafts and Tudor Revival style, and is one of his early works.

The listing includes the garage as another contributing building and a stone wall as a contributing object. In 1998 there was an ivy-covered wood and wire fence along the top of the wall.

See also
Alexander D. McDougall House, nearby at 3814 NW Thurman Street, another NRHP-listed example of Ellis Lawrence's work
 National Register of Historic Places listings in Northwest Portland, Oregon

References

Houses on the National Register of Historic Places in Portland, Oregon
Houses completed in 1911
Tudor Revival architecture in Oregon
Arts and Crafts architecture in Oregon
1911 establishments in Oregon
Northwest Portland, Oregon
Portland Historic Landmarks